Shivaji VII (22 November 1941 – 28 September 1946) was a Maharaja of Kolhapur from the Bhonsle dynasty, reigning from 1941 to 1946. He was from the Satara branch of the Bhonsle dynasty, and had been appointed to the vacant Kolhapur throne from birth, as Rajaram III had only left a daughter. Being so very young, he took no position in ruling the state, which was administered under a regency during his lifetime. He died at the age of 4 in 1946, and was succeeded by Shahaji II.

His full name was His Highness Kshatriya-Kulawatasana Sinhasanadhishwar, Shrimant Rajashri Shivaji VII Chhatrapati Maharaj Sahib Bahadur.

External links

Child monarchs from Asia
Monarchs who died as children
1941 births
1946 deaths
Maharajas of Kolhapur